Casualism may refer to:

Casualism (art), a 21st-century trend in the visual arts
Casualism (philosophy), the view that the universe, its creation and development is solely based on randomness

See also
Casual labour, paid work on an irregular basis
Causalism, the view that behavior and actions are the result of previous mental states